Colin McGrath MLA (born 21 October 1975) is an Irish Social Democratic and Labour Party (SDLP) politician from Northern Ireland. He has been a Member of the Northern Ireland Assembly for South Down since the 2016 election.

Background 
McGrath was born in the town of Downpatrick, County Down on 21 October 1975. He attended St Patrick's Primary School Saul, St Patrick's Grammar School and the East Down Institute (now part of South Eastern Regional College).

Following his completion of secondary education, McGrath attended the University of Ulster Jordanstown and graduated in 1998 in Community Youth Work. He then became a youth worker in Patrician Youth Centre, Downpatrick for 17 years.

Political career 
McGrath was first elected to the Down District Council in 2005 as a councillor for the SDLP. He served as both chair and vice-chair, becoming the youngest ever chair of the local council. In 2014 he was elected to the newly formed Newry, Mourne & Down District Council.

He entered Assembly politics when he contested the 2016 Northern Ireland Assembly election, being elected with 5,110 first-preference votes alongside fellow SDLP candidate Sinéad Bradley. The third and incumbent SDLP candidate, Seán Rogers, was not elected and so lost his seat. He was re-elected in the 2017 snap NI Assembly election. During his time in the Assembly, McGrath served as a member of the Education Committee, Business Committee and Procedures Committee.

McGrath has highlighted rural issues, accessibility to local services such as the Downe Hospital and youth issues as his main priorities. He has criticised the eleven-plus transfer system, arguing that a level playing field is required and condemning the branding of 11-year-old children as "failures" if they fail to achieve high marks. He supports his party position that academic selection "brands a large portion of children as failures and puts an inordinate amount of pressure on them". He has however argued that the debate is about academic selection rather than a disapproval of Grammar schools.

He currently serves as chairman and Health Spokesperson for the SDLP.

References

 Colin McGrath MLA | People | SDLP. www.sdlp.ie. Retrieved 18 February 2019. 
 MLA Details: Mr Colin McGrath. aims.niassembly.gov.uk. Retrieved 18 February 2019. 
 SDLP MLA Colin McGrath: 'When I was 10 my sister died. She was 16 and was gone within two days'. www.belfasttelegraph.co.uk. Retrieved 18 February 2019.

External links 

 Colin McGrath MLA, SDLP website. 
 Members of the NI Assembly, NI Assembly.
 TheyWorkForYou Voting Record, TheyWorkForYou, TheyWorkForYou.

1975 births
Living people
Members of Down District Council
Social Democratic and Labour Party councillors
Social Democratic and Labour Party MLAs
Northern Ireland MLAs 2016–2017
Northern Ireland MLAs 2017–2022
Northern Ireland MLAs 2022–2027